Christopher Roberto Ortega Fernández (born 4 March 1986) is a Mexican former footballer who played as a midfielder.

Club career
Ortega made his Primera División de México debut in the last round of the Apertura 2007 tournament, entering as a second-half substitute in the match against Monterrey on 10 November 2007.

See also
Football in Mexico
List of football clubs in Mexico

References

External links
 Christopher Roberto Ortega at Club América
 

1986 births
Living people
Footballers from Mexico City
Club América footballers
Mexican footballers
Association football midfielders